Vice-Admiral Afzal Akram Rahman Khan (Urdu: افضل رحمان خان; born: 1921— 1983; popularly known as  Admiral A. R. Khan), HQA, HPk, HJ, was a Pakistan Navy admiral, politician, and the Commander in Chief of Pakistan Navy, serving under President Ayub Khan from 1959 until 1966.

Prior to that, he also simultaneously served in the Ayub Khan's administration as an Interior Minister and Defence Minister until resigning when General Yahya Khan, an Army Commander-in-Chief, enforced a martial law in 1969. Gaining commission in Royal Indian Navy in 1938, he served in first war with India in 1947 in non-combat operations but earned notability and prestige when he commanded the Pakistan Navy against Indian Navy during the war with India in 1965.

In addition, he is noted for being the longest serving commander-in-chief of navy as well as responsible for launching and introducing the submarine program in the navy.

Biography
Afzal Akram Rahman Khan Vardak was born in British India on 20 March 1921, His family migrated from Gurdaspur,  Ex-Senator Asif Fasihuddin Vardak is relative of him, and it is known very little on his early life primarily based on literature published in combined military history of Pakistan and India. As many of his contemporaries in the British Indian military, he was educated at the Rashtriya Indian Military College at Dehradun, and gained commission as a Midshipman in the Royal Indian Navy in 1938. He was also trained as naval artillery specialist from Britannia Royal Naval College in United Kingdom and participated in World War II on behalf of Great Britain.

After World War II, he studied at the Command and Staff College in 1945 and graduated with a staff course degree in 1946. During this time, he was contemporary to Gopal Gurunath Bewoor, Iqbal Khan and Abdul Hamid Khan– all became generals in Indian and Pakistan Army. He provided his gunnery services to HMS Duke of York at the time of the partition of British India and decided to opted for Pakistan in 1947. He did not actively participated in first war with India in 1947, instead he commanded a destroyer from Karachi to Mumbai to oversee the evacuation of Indian emigrants to Pakistan. He was among the first twenty naval officers who joined the Royal Pakistan Navy (RPN) as a Lieutenant with a service number PN. 0006. He was the third most senior Lieutenant in the navy in terms of seniority list provided by the Royal Indian Navy to the Ministry of Defense (MoD) in 1947.

In 1949, he was promoted as Lieutenant-Commander and served as commanding officer of PNS Tariq, the first destroyer, when it was commissioned from the Royal Navy on 30 September 1949. In 1950, he was promoted as Commander and commanded the Tippu Sultan and sailed on a goodwill mission to Middle East and Eastern Europe; he visited Jeddah, Malta, Venice, Athens, Istanbul, Izmir and Crete.

In 1951, he participated in Task Force 91 that was held in Trincomalee Sri Lanka with the Royal Navy. At Trincomalee, they had a rendezvous with a large force (9 ships) of the Royal Navy, the Indian Navy and the Royal Ceylon Navy. It led to 14 days of strenuous exercises in harbour and at sea. The officers and men from these ships also took part in various Inter Services Tournaments. His career progressed well in the navy and helped establish the Naval Intelligence (NI) and helped establish the Karachi Naval Dockyard.

In 1958–59, the Naval NHQ staff had been in a brief conflict with the Ministry of Defence over the rearmament issues which eventually led the resignation of Vice-Admiral HMS Choudrie. Afzal Rahman Khan was never appointed to four-star admiral rank but nonetheless was appointed as Commander in Chief of Pakistan Navy after his nomination papers were approved by then-President Iskander Mirza in 1959.

Prior to his appointment as commander in chief of navy, his command responsibilities included as his role as Commander Pakistan Fleet (COMPAK) and Commander Logistics (COMLOG) commands headquartered in Karachi, Sindh with being promoted to the two-star rank of Rear-Admiral. After promoting as Vice-Admiral, he oversaw the induction of submarines in the navy in 1960s; for this, he is viewed as the "father of submarines force" of Pakistan Navy.

He earned public notability when he acted as a leader during the war with India in 1965 despite having prior no knowledge on covert operation in Indian Kashmir. He oversaw the planning of and execution of the naval operation to attack the Indian Navy which earned him the prestige in the country. After the war, he was publicly honored and was decorated with Hilal-i-Jurat by President Ayub Khan. He is noted for his multiple extension in the navy that made him noted as the longest serving chief of staff of navy.

He was known to be closer to President Ayub Khan who appointed him as the Defence and Interior Minister in 1966 while serving as an active-duty admiral. About the uprising and riots in East-Pakistan in 1969, Vice-Admiral Rahman told the journalists that the "country was under the Mob rule and that Police were not strong enough to tackle the situation." He served in ministerial post until 1969 when President Ayub Khan resigned and handed over the presidency to his Army Commander-in-Chief General Yahya Khan who suspended the Constitution. In protest to the  martial law, Vice-Admiral A.R. Khan resigned from his portfolio on 25 March 1969. Khan resigned from the ministries as a protest when General Yahya Khan, instituted another martial law on 25 March 1969.

After his resignation, Khan retired from national politics and moved to Islamabad in 1969 where he lived a very quiet and private life. He did not comment on war with India in 1971 as he diminished his role from the politics in 1970s. In 1987, the Pakistan Navy honored him after establishing a naval base under his name. The PNS Akram now serves as a forward operating base for the Navy and acts as a depot for all naval personnel stationed west of Ormara.

He avoided the media and lived on a military pension; he died at an old age in Islamabad in 1983. His death went unnoticed in the media and he was quietly buried in Islamabad with close family members attending his funeral.

References

External links
Official website of Pakistan Navy

 

|-

|-

1921 births
2005 deaths
Rashtriya Indian Military College alumni
Royal Indian Navy officers
Indian people of World War II
Pakistan Navy admirals
Chiefs of Naval Staff (Pakistan)
Military personnel of the Indo-Pakistani War of 1965
Interior ministers of Pakistan
Defence Ministers of Pakistan
Recipients of Hilal-i-Jur'at
Admirals of the Indo-Pakistani War of 1965